The naval order of 24 October 1918 was a plan made by the German Admiralty at the end of World War I to provoke a decisive battle between the German High Seas Fleet and the British Grand Fleet in the southern North Sea. When the order to prepare for the sortie was issued on 29 October, mutiny broke out aboard the German ships.  Despite the operation being cancelled, these in turn led to the more serious Kiel mutiny, which was the starting point of the November Revolution and the proclamation of the Weimar Republic.

Background

Armistice negotiations
This operation resulted from the exchange of diplomatic notes, beginning on 5 October 1918, between the new German government under Prince Max of Baden and President Woodrow Wilson, in which Germany asked the President to mediate an armistice.  One of Wilson's preconditions was the cessation of Germany's submarine war.  Despite the objections of Admiral Scheer, the Chief of the German Admiralty Staff, the German government made this concession on 20 October.  The U-boats at sea were recalled on 21 October.  In response, on 22 October Scheer ordered Admiral Hipper, commander of the High Seas Fleet, to prepare for an attack on the British fleet, utilising the main battle fleet, reinforced by the newly available U-boats.  Hipper's order was promulgated on 24 October;  Scheer approved it on 27 October.  The fleet then began to concentrate at Schillig Roads off Wilhelmshaven to prepare for the battle.

German fleet
The High Seas Fleet in October 1918 was built around the core of 18 battleships and five battlecruisers, most of which had been completed before the outbreak of war. Since the Battle of Jutland in May 1916, the obsolete pre-dreadnoughts had been de-commissioned, two new battleships with 15-inch guns ( and ) and the new battlecruiser  had joined the fleet, but one dreadnought battleship  had been damaged beyond repair by running aground in the Baltic. The fleet had undertaken only three major sorties at full strength into the  North Sea since June 1916: 18–19 August 1916, 18–19 October 1916, and 22–25 April 1918.  This prolonged period of relative inactivity, at a time when all other branches of Germany's armed forces were very heavily engaged, did much to undermine the morale of the crews and the self-respect of the officers. Acts tantamount to mutiny took place on various occasions during 1917, the most noteworthy being the arrest of 200 men from the battleship  in August, resulting in two executions.

Royal Navy

Grand Fleet
In late October 1918 the British Grand Fleet, based at Rosyth in the Firth of Forth, had 35 dreadnought battleships and 11 battlecruisers (including two of the very lightly armoured ). Five of these ships were from the United States Navy and one from the Royal Australian Navy.

The materiel problems which beset the Grand Fleet at the Battle of Jutland and beyond (i.e. poor flash-protection in ammunition handling, lack of deck armour over magazines, deficient armour-piercing shells, and too few destroyers) had all been remedied to various extents. In particular, the newly designed "Green Boy" shells for the fleet's heavy guns were thought to be such a great improvement in offensive power that they nullified the advantage of the heavier armour protection of German battleships. Moreover, the fleet possessed new weapons (such as ship-borne torpedo aircraft and fast steam-driven submarines) for which the German fleet had no match.

The second wave of the Spanish Flu pandemic reached its peak in the Grand Fleet in autumn 1918; roughly 6% of the fleet's sailors were taken ill, and 1% died.  For example, the sick list of the light cruiser  peaked at 19 people (6% of her complement) on 23 October 1918; but it had returned to its usual level (two persons) by 31 October; the destroyer  of the 12th Destroyer Flotilla was more seriously hit, with 37 (41%) of her crew on the sick list on 31 October.

The morale in the British fleet was high in anticipation of a re-match for Jutland, the personality and leadership of the commander-in-chief, Admiral Sir David Beatty, being an important reason for this.

Admiralty intelligence
In the First World War British naval intelligence in general, and code-breaking in particular, was highly efficient. It played a very important role in the battles of Dogger Bank and Jutland, in the American entry into the war on the Allied side and the defeat of the U-boats from 1917–18.  By late 1917 improvements in German communications security had made intelligence gathering more difficult, at least as far as the High Seas Fleet was concerned. Between October 1917 and April 1918, the Germans were able to launch three surprise sorties into Norwegian waters against mercantile traffic, on the last occasion (22–25 April 1918) employing their whole fleet.  Each time the British did not receive a warning in time to mount an effective counter-operation.

High-power wireless communications were essential for the control of U-boats at sea; but this also allowed triangulation-based location of the U-boats by the Allies.  In addition, U-boats employed a simpler cypher system than that used by the surface fleet, which Room 40, the British Admiralty's code-breaking section, could usually read with few difficulties. In October 1918 these methods allowed the Admiralty to track the U-boats operating in British Home Waters.

Prelude

Operational order
The order of 24 October for the High Seas Fleet's attack is as follows:

U-boat operations
The command of the High Seas Fleet had 24 submarines at its disposal, which lay at their bases in the North Sea. The command tried to recall more boats from the missions and direct them to the planned locations. This succeeded with six more boats: U-43, U-108, UB-86, UB-96, UB-121, and UB-125. All boats were to form six lines in the North Sea on the presumed approach route of the British fleet and take up waiting positions in front of the ports of the British fleet in Scotland.  

Two of these U-boats were lost. The first,  (Oblt. All 40 crewmen were lost.

She was commanded by the 26-year-old Oberleutnant zur See Hans Joachim Emsmann who, since first becoming a U-boat captain in February 1918, had sunk a total of 26 ships. She attempted to enter Scapa Flow submerged by the southern passage, Hoxa Sound, on the evening of 28 October. Hydrophones mounted ashore at Stanger Head, Flotta, alerted the British defences, and the sea-bed magnetometer loops, designed to detect the magnetic signatures of incoming vessels and thus trigger remote-controlled mines, were activated. Emsmann raised his periscope at 11:30 pm, presumably to check his position, and was spotted by look-outs on shore; the mines detonated shortly thereafter, leaving the submarine disabled on the sea bed. She was finished off by depth charges from defense trawlers shortly thereafter; all 37 crew members were lost.

Two other submarines, UB-98 and UB-118 were damaged in collision with each other on 28 October, and had to return to port. Five others, U-43, U-67, UB-86, UB-87, and UB-130 also aborted their missions due to breakdowns.

British reaction
The commanders of the British Fleet were anticipating action, and the fleet was warned to make preparations as early as 14 October 1918. On the afternoon of 23 October the Admiralty alerted Admiral Beatty that the situation was abnormal and that they would reinforce him by sending destroyers from the anti-submarine flotillas based at Plymouth and Buncrana. By late on 28 October the situation was reaching a climax, and Vice Admiral Sydney Fremantle, the Deputy Chief of the Naval Staff, and Rear Admiral Reginald Hall, the Director of Naval Intelligence, sent Beatty a full appreciation which read, in part:

For the next 48 hours, Fremantle was able to keep Beatty informed of developments, correctly describing the concentration of the High Seas Fleet at Schillig Roads on the evening of 29 October and its intention to sail on 30 October. Hipper's unexpected postponement of the operation on 30 October was initially ascribed to fog.

Cancellation of the plan
The High Seas Fleet had assembled in Schillig Roads on the afternoon of 29 October in preparation for sailing the following day, 30 October. A ruse that the operation was a training sortie was employed for security, as was usual practice. The raid on the Thames and the Flanders Coast was scheduled for dawn on 31 October and the battle with the British Fleet in the afternoon and evening of the same day. The evening of 29 October was marked by unrest and serious acts of indiscipline in the German Fleet, as the men became convinced their commanders were intent on sacrificing them to sabotage the armistice negotiations. A large number of stokers from Derfflinger and Von der Tann failed to return from shore leave and were rounded up by the authorities; mass insubordination occurred on Thüringen, Kaiserin, Helgoland and Regensburg; and mutinous demonstrations took place in König, Kronprinz Wilhelm and Markgraf.  Even in the fleet flagship Baden the mood of the crew was dangerous. The mutinous behavior was confined to the crews of the larger ships; the crews of torpedo-boats, submarines, and minesweepers remained loyal. Admiral Hipper canceled the operation on 30 October and ordered the fleet to disperse, in the hope of quelling the insurrection.  When ships of the III Battle Squadron, arrived at Kiel via the Kaiser Wilhelm Canal on 1 November, their men helped spark the Kiel mutiny on 3 November.

Aftermath

Analysis
The detailed orders of battle are given in the Appendix, and are summarised in the table below. The disparity in forces was roughly 2-to-1 in favour of the British.  Had the battle been joined, it would have involved some 69 capital ships (in comparison with 58 involved at Jutland).

Writing after the war, Admiral Scheer asserted that "it was highly probable an expedition of the Fleet might achieve a favourable result. If the Fleet suffered losses, it was to be assumed that the enemy's injuries would be in proportion, and that we should still have sufficient forces to protect the U-boat campaign in the North Sea, which would have to be resumed if the negotiations should make imperative a continuation of the struggle with all the means at our disposal." The High Seas Fleet had undertaken similar diversionary attacks intended to draw British units into a submarine/mine ambush before: the action of 19 August 1916 was the one occasion when this tactic came closest to succeeding. On 27 October, the German Government had agreed to surrender the fleet as part of the armistice; thus in strictly material terms, the German Navy had nothing to lose.

Admiral Beatty's intentions are not recorded but there seems no doubt that he would have sailed as soon as the Germans were reported to be at sea and would have aggressively pursued battle.   Given the distances involved, if the German sortie were reported promptly and the Grand Fleet sailed immediately on receipt of such a report, there was every possibility that they could have cut off the German line of retreat and forced a fight to the finish. Admiral Hipper and his staff seemed well aware of the risk in this plan, and his chief of staff Adolf von Trotha expressed a sanguinary attitude about it: "a battle for the honour of the fleet in this war, even if it were a death battle, it would be the foundation for a new German fleet".

Henry Newbolt, the official historian of the Royal Navy during the First World War, compared Hipper's planned operation with Michiel de Ruyter's Raid on the Medway in June 1667, when the Dutch Fleet launched a surprise attack on the English naval bases in the Thames estuary, inflicting a serious defeat and in consequence securing a more favourable peace treaty for the Netherlands at the end of the Second Anglo-Dutch War.

More recently, it has been argued that the plan was a deliberate act of counter-revolution by the German Naval High Command against Prince Max of Baden and the peace party: regardless of the outcome of the battle, the launching of the attack would have hopelessly compromised the armistice negotiations and the credibility of Prince Max's government.

Orders of battle

German fleet
The German fleet was to be organised into three groups, plus supporting submarines and airships, as follows 
 High Seas Fleet
 Commander-in-Chief, High Seas Fleet: Admiral Franz Ritter von Hipper in battleship Baden
 Scouting forces
 Commander, Scouting Forces: RAdm Ludwig von Reuter in battlecruiser Hindenburg
 I. SG (RAdm Reuter) battlecruisers:  (F), 
 II. SG (Cdre Viktor Harder) light cruisers:  (F), 
 Deputy Leader of Torpedo-Boats FKpt Hans Quaet-Faslem in light cruiser 
 II.
 VII.
 Main body (under Commander-in-Chief)
 III. BS (VAdm Hugo Kraft), battleships:  (F), 
 Fleet Flagship battleship:  (F, Adm Hipper)
 I. BS (VAdm Friedrich Boedicker) battleships:  (F), 
 IV. BS (VAdm Hugo Meurer) battleships:  (F), 
 Leader of Torpedo-Boats Cdre Paul Heinrich(GE) in light cruiser 
 VI.
 IX.
 Minelaying group
 IV. SG (RAdm Johannes von Karpf(GE)) light cruisers:  (F), ; attached minelayers: , 
 VIII.
 Airships: L65, L64, L63, L52, L61, L56, SL22

British
This is the administrative order of battle of the Grand Fleet and other important commands in Home Waters on 11 November 1918.
 Excluded from this list are ships on detached service and minor vessels of war such as minesweepers, sloops and older vessels employed on patrol duties; it includes only forces likely to have been engaged had the German sortie gone ahead. Some of these ships may not in fact have been available to sail on 30 October due to breakdowns or routine maintenance. The Grand Fleet was based at Rosyth, with usually one Squadron detached to Scapa Flow for gunnery training.
 Grand Fleet
 Commander-in Chief: Adm Sir David Beatty in battleship 
 1st BS (Adm Sir Charles Madden) battleships:  (F), 
 2nd BS (VAdm Sir John de Robeck) battleships:  (F), 
 4th BS (VAdm Sir Montague Browning) battleships:  (F), 
 5th BS (VAdm A C Leveson) battleships:  (F), 
 6th BS (RAdm H Rodman) battleships: (USN) (F), (USN), (USN), (USN), (USN)
 Cruisers (with main body)
 2nd CS (RAdm E F Bruen) armoured cruisers:  (F), 
 4th LCS (RAdm A F Everett) light cruisers:  (F), 
 7th LCS (RAdm G H Borrett) light cruisers:  (F), 
 Flying Squadron (RAdm R F Phillimore) aircraft carriers:  (F), 
 Battlecruiser force
 Commander-in-Chief: VAdm Sir William Pakenham in battlecruiser 
 1st BCS (RAdm Sir Henry Oliver) battlecruisers:  (F), 
 2nd BCS (RAdm Sir Lionel Halsey) battlecruisers:  (F), (RAN), 
 1st CS (VAdm T D W Napier) battlecruisers:  (F), 
 1st LCS (RAdm W H Cowan):  (F), 
 2nd LCS (RAdm J A Fergusson):  (F), (RAN), (RAN), 
 3rd LCS (RAdm A T Hunt):  (F), 
 6th LCS (RAdm E S Alexander-Sinclair):  (F), 
 Destroyer Command
 Commodore (Destroyers): Cdre H J Tweedie in light cruiser 
 Harwich Force
 5th LCS (RAdm Sir Reginald Tyrwhitt) light cruisers:  (F), 
 Dover Force
 Minelaying destroyers
 Submarines operating with the Battle Fleet
 North Sea patrols

Abbreviations
 Adm: Admiral
 BCS: Battle Cruiser Squadron
 BS: Battle Squadron (German: Geschwader)
 Cdre: Commodore (German: Kommodore)
 CS: Cruiser Squadron
 DF: Destroyer Flotilla
 F: Flagship
 FKpt: Fregattenkapitän (frigate captain)
 hf: half-flotilla (German: halbflottille)
 LCS: Light Cruiser Squadron
 RAdm: Rear Admiral  (German: Konteradmiral)
 (RAN): Denotes a ship of the Royal Australian Navy
 S/MF: Submarine Flotilla
 SG: Scouting Group (German: Aufklärungsgruppe)
 TBF: Torpedo-Boat Flotilla (German: Torpedoboot Flottille)
 (USN): Denotes a ship of the United States Navy
 VAdm: Vice Admiral  (German: Vizeadmiral)

Notes

References

Bibliography

 
 
 F. J. Dittmar and J. J. Colledge (1972), British Warships 1914–1919 (Shepperton: Ian Allan Ltd. SBN 7110 0380 7).
 Admiral Walter Gladisch (GE) (1965), Der Krieg zur See 1914-18/Nordsee Bd.7 (Frankfurt: Verlag E S Mittler & Sohn). New critical edition: Gerhard P. Groß (ed.) assisted by Werner Rahn: Der Krieg in der Nordsee. Vom Sommer 1917 bis zum Kriegsende 1918. Hamburg/Berlin/Bonn 2006 (Der Krieg zur See 1914–1918, Bd. 7).
 Robert M. Grant (1969), U-Boat Intelligence 1914–1918 (London: Putnam).
 Erich Gröner(GE)(1983), Die deutschen Kriegsschiffe 1815–1945, Bd.2: Torpedoboote, Zerstörer, Schnellboote, Minensuchboote, Minenräumboote (Koblenz: Bernard & Graefe Verlag. ).
 Prof. Arthur J. Marder (1969), From the Dreadnought to Scapa Flow, The Royal Navy in the Fisher Era, 1904–1919: Victory and Aftermath volume 5 (Oxford: Oxford University Press).
 
 Tobias R. Philbin III (1982), Admiral von Hipper: The Inconvenient Hero (Amsterdam: B. R. Grüner Publishing Co. ).
 Reinhard Scheer (1920), Germany's High Seas Fleet in the World War , English edition (London: Cassell and Company, Ltd.), Ch.18.
 Rear Admiral Arno Spindler (1966), Der Krieg zur See 1914–18/Handelskrieg mit U-booten, Bd.5 (Frankfurt: Verlag E S Mittler & Sohn).

North Sea operations of World War I
Naval battles of World War I involving the United Kingdom
Naval battles of World War I involving Germany
Military history of the North Sea
1918 in the United Kingdom
Conflicts in 1918
Cancelled military operations involving Germany
1918 in Germany
1918 documents